Alfred Neugebauer (24 December 1888 – 14 September 1957) was an Austrian film actor.

Selected filmography
 Money in the Streets (1922)
 Money on the Street (1930)
 Madame Bluebeard (1931)
 Storm in a Water Glass (1931)
 The Prince of Arcadia (1932)
 Our Emperor (1933)
 The Secret of Cavelli (1934)
 Spring Parade (1934)
 A Precocious Girl (1934)
 A Star Fell from Heaven (1934)
 … nur ein Komödiant (1935)
 The World's in Love (1935)
 Everything for the Company (1935)
 Heaven on Earth (1935)
 Harvest (1936)
 The Postman from Longjumeau (1936)
 Flowers from Nice (1936)
 Where the Lark Sings (1936)
 Konzert in Tirol (1938)
 Mirror of Life (1938)
 Hotel Sacher (1939)
 Madame Butterfly (1939)
 A Mother's Love (1939)
 Vienna Tales (1940)
 Operetta (1940)
 Seven Years Hard Luck (1940)
 Love is Duty Free (1941)
 Whom the Gods Love (1942)
 Vienna 1910 (1943)
 Women Are No Angels (1943)
 Two Happy People (1943)
 The Heart Must Be Silent (1944)
 Viennese Girls (1945)
 Maresi (1948)
 The Angel with the Trumpet (1948)
 Eroica (1949)
 The Fourth Commandment (1950)
 Captive Soul (1952)
 1. April 2000 (1952)
 No Greater Love (1952)
 The Spendthrift (1953)
 A Night in Venice (1953)
 Grandstand for General Staff (1953)
 Victoria in Dover (1954)
 Royal Hunt in Ischl (1955)

External links

1888 births
1957 deaths
Austrian male film actors
Austrian male silent film actors
Male actors from Vienna
20th-century Austrian male actors